William Hanger, 3rd Baron Coleraine (6 August 1744 – 11 December 1814), styled The Honourable William Hanger between 1762 and 1794, was a British politician.

Hanger was the second surviving son of Gabriel Hanger, 1st Baron Coleraine, by Elizabeth Bond, daughter and heiress of Richard Bond, of Hereford. He sat as Member of Parliament for East Retford between 1775 and 1778, for Aldborough between 1778 and 1780 and for St Michael's between 1780 and 1784. In 1794 he succeeded his elder brother John in the barony. This was an Irish peerage and did not entitle him to a seat in the English House of Lords (although it did entitle him to a seat in the Irish House of Lords.

Lord Coleraine died in December 1814, aged 70, and was succeeded in the title by his younger brother, George.

References

1744 births
1814 deaths
Barons in the Peerage of Ireland
Members of the Parliament of Great Britain for English constituencies
Members of the Parliament of Great Britain for constituencies in Cornwall
British MPs 1774–1780
British MPs 1780–1784
Barons Coleraine